Coelastrum is a genus of green algae in the Scenedesmaceae family.

Species list

Coelastrum astroideum
Coelastrum cambricum
Coelastrum chodatii
Coelastrum crenatum
Coelastrum giganteum
Coelastrum indicum
Coelastrum irregulare
Coelastrum microporum
Coelastrum morus
Coelastrum naegelii
Coelastrum printzii
Coelastrum probiscideum 
Coelastrum pseudomicroporum 
Coelastrum pulchellum
Coelastrum pulchrum
Coelastrum reticulatum
Coelastrum schizodermaticum
Coelastrum sphaericum
Coelastrum stuhlmanii
Coelastrum triangulare
Coelastrum verrucosum

References

 

Sphaeropleales genera
Sphaeropleales